The Snow-child is a widespread European folktale,   found in many medieval tellings.

It is Aarne–Thompson type 1362.

Synopsis
A merchant returns home after an absence of two years to find his wife with a newborn son. She explains one snowy day she swallowed a snowflake while thinking about her husband which caused her to conceive. Pretending to believe, he raises the boy with her until he takes the boy on a trip and sells him into slavery. On his return, he explains to his wife that the boy melted in the heat.

Variants
The tale first appears in the 11th-century Cambridge Songs. It also appears in Medieval fabliaux, and was used in school exercises of rhetoric. A Medieval play about the Virgin Mary has characters disbelieving her story of her pregnancy citing the tale.

It contrasts to Aarne-Thompson type 703*, Snow Maiden, where a child really has a magical snow-related origin.

References

Folklore
Fabliaux
European folklore
ATU 1350-1439